Highett may refer to:

 Highett, Victoria, Australia
 Highett railway station
 William Highett (1807–1880), Australian politician
 Highett Football Club, Australian-rules football club in Highett, Melbourne, Victoria, Australia

See also

 
 Highet
 Highest (disambiguation)